was a Japanese record label, originally published by the company  established in Osaka on March 20, 1920. The label was also called the "Swallow Brand", because of their trademark artwork.

Nitto was known as a prolific brand, with over 2,000 titles published in about five years. In 1925, they were recognized as one of the two major labels in Japan at that time.

The label produced numerous records of traditional Japanese music and art such as Jōruri, as well as solo plays of western music and orchestra recordings, although the latter remained small in the share of their overall production. After the takeover, Taihei renamed the newly merged company , while maintaining the "Swallow Brand - Nitto Records" along with other labels.

In one article of a long run series (1997–1999) celebrating the 120th anniversary of phonograph, the Kobe Shimbun wrote:
"The only company which could rival Columbia Records head-to-head in the market... (Nitto was) so tightly focused on traditional arts which made them late in responding to rapidly growing demand for popular music. Moreover, it was the retirement of Morishita, who was driving Nitto's marketing strategy all alone, that determined the fate of Nitto."

The Swallow Nitto brand finally disappeared in 1942, when Dainippon Gramophone was absorbed by Kodansha, shareholder of King Records, to become only a production facility of the latter.

Musicians who worked for the label included pop and jazz composer Ryoichi Hattori. Artists signed to the label included Korean soprano Yun Sim-deok.

The British Library Sound Archive holds several Nitto 78rpm discs of the nagauta genre in its collection.

See also
 List of record labels

References

Japanese record labels
Record labels established in 1920
Record labels disestablished in 1935